Toy Story 2: An Original Walt Disney Records Soundtrack is the soundtrack album to Toy Story 2. The score for the film is composed by Randy Newman, who previously composed for its predecessor, Toy Story. It was released by Walt Disney Records on November 9, 1999. Although out of print in the U.S., the CD is available in the U.S. as an import and all but one song is available digitally.

The album features two original songs written for the film – "When She Loved Me" (the main song in the film) and "Woody's Roundup" along with Newman's score. The song from the first film "You've Got a Friend in Me", was also reused.

The music received several nominations at prominent award ceremonies, including Academy, Golden Globe, Satellite and Saturn award nominations. It won the Annie Award for Outstanding Achievement for Music in a Feature Production for Newman, and the song "When She Loved Me" won the Grammy Award for Best Song Written for a Motion Picture, Television or Other Visual Media. In addition to the awards, the track was also considered for the nomination for AFI's 100 Years...100 Songs in 2004, by the American Film Institute.

Songs 
Randy Newman wrote two new songs for Toy Story 2 as well as the complete original score. "When She Loved Me" is performed by Newman, along with Sarah McLachlan. The track is used in the flashback montage in which Jessie experiences being loved, forgotten, then abandoned by her owner, Emily. "When She Loved Me" received praise from critics, who found the song moving and heartbreaking, praising Newman's songwriting and McLachlan's vocal performance. It earned a reputation as one of the saddest sequences in both Pixar and Disney films, as well as one of the saddest film songs ever written. The song was nominated at the Academy Awards in 2000 for Best Original Song, but lost Phil Collins for "You'll Be in My Heart" from another Disney animated film, Tarzan. It also lost the Golden Globe Award for Best Original Song to Collins for the same track.

Another song "Woody's Roundup" is performed by Newman and Riders in the Sky. It is the theme song for the Woody's Roundup television show, while also being used in the end-credit music. The film carried over one song from Toy Story, "You've Got a Friend in Me," sung at two different points during the film by Tom Hanks as Woody and Robert Goulet, the singing voice of Wheezy.

Track listing

Chart positions

Accolades

References

Bibliography 

 

Pixar soundtracks
1999 soundtrack albums
Walt Disney Records soundtracks
Randy Newman soundtracks
Toy Story
Film scores
Animated film soundtracks
Comedy-drama film soundtracks